Édouard Roger-Vasselin and Nicolas Mahut defeated Ivan Dodig and Austin Krajicek in the final, 7–6(7–4), 6–3 to win the doubles tennis title at the 2022 Firenze Open. 

This was the first edition of an ATP Tour event in Florence since 1994.

Seeds

Draw

Draw

References

External links
 Main draw

Firenze Open - Doubles